Elections to Northampton Borough Council were held on 3 May 2007. The whole council was up for election and the Liberal Democrats gained overall control of the council from no overall control.

Election result

|}

Ward results

External links
2007 Northampton election result

2007 English local elections
2007
2000s in Northamptonshire